FC Astoria Walldorf is a German association football club from the town of Walldorf, Baden-Württemberg.

The club is named after John Jacob Astor, who was born in Walldorf in 1763 and later emigrated to the United States where he became a successful businessman. His descendants, founders of the Waldorf-Astoria Hotel, generously supported the town of Walldorf and the new football club, formed in 1908, was named Astoria in his honour.



History
The club was formed on 15 February 1995 through the union of the 1. FC 08 Walldorf and the football department of SG Walldorf Astoria 02. The new club advanced to the Verbandsliga Nordbaden (V) in 2001. Winning the Verbandsliga in 2007, the club was promoted to the Oberliga Baden-Württemberg.

Like TSG 1899 Hoffenheim the club is supported by Dietmar Hopp, the founder of software maker SAP. Hopp initiated negotiations to merge FC Astoria Walldorf, TSG Hoffenheim, and SV Sandhausen to create FC Heidelberg 06 with the long-term objective of reaching the Bundesliga, Germany's first division league. The talks were abandoned in 2005 due to the resistance of the latter two clubs, and the failure to agree on whether the new side's stadium should be located in Heidelberg or Eppelheim.

A North Baden Cup win in 2013–14 earned the club the right to enter the first round of the 2014–15 DFB-Pokal, the German Cup, for the first time. In the same season the club also won the Oberliga title and earned promotion to the tier four Regionalliga Südwest for the first time.

Honours
The club's honours:

League
 Oberliga Baden-Württemberg (V)
 Champions: 2014
 Runners-up: 2010, 2013
 Verbandsliga Baden (V)
 Champions: 2007, 2016

Cup
 Baden Cup 
 Winners: 2014, 2016

Current squad

Recent managers
Recent managers of the club:

Recent seasons
The recent season-by-season performance of the club:

FC Astoria Walldorf

FC Astoria Walldorf II

 With the introduction of the Regionalligas in 1994 and the 3. Liga in 2008 as the new third tier, below the 2. Bundesliga, all leagues below dropped one tier.

Key

Stadium
FC Astoria Walldorf plays its home matches in the FC-Astoria stadium which features a natural turf field and two artificial turf fields. During the 2006 World Cup the facility was used as the training ground of the Costa Rican national side.

References

External links 

Das deutsche Fußball-Archiv historical German domestic league tables (in German)
FC Astoria Walldorf at Weltfussball.de

Football clubs in Germany
Football clubs in Baden-Württemberg
Association football clubs established in 1995
1995 establishments in Germany